Love, Surrender, Forgiveness is the second EP by American shred guitarist Katrina Johansson, released independently in 2007.

Track listing
All songs were written by Katrina Johansson.

"Scar Tissue"
"Bellydance"
"Love Surrender Forgiveness"
"K-9 Lullaby" (Remix)

Credits
Katrina Johansson – guitars
Wolfe – drums
Mike Hoffmann – bass, slide guitar, 12-string guitar, production
Michael Angelo Batio – bass on "K-9 Lullaby"
Brad Rohrssen – drums on "K-9 Lullaby"
Chris Djuricic – engineering, mixing

External links
Katrina Johansson official site
Katrina Johansson MySpace page
Katrina Johansson Dean Guitars profile

2007 EPs
Katrina Johansson albums